The 2015 Cross River State gubernatorial election was the 9th gubernatorial election of Cross River State. Held on April 11, 2015, the People's Democratic Party nominee Benedict Ayade won the election, defeating Odey Ochicha of the All Progressives Congress.

PDP primary
PDP candidate and a serving Senator representing Cross River North Senatorial District, Benedict Ayade defeated 5 other contestants to clinch the party ticket. He won with 752 votes out of 782 votes cast to defeat his closest rival Joe Agi who received 11 votes. Former Group General Manager of Nigerian National Petroleum Corporation, Goddy Jedy Agba received 5 votes, Francis Eworo received 5 votes, a former National Publicity Secretary of Peoples Democratic Party, Emmanuel Ibeshi and Peter Oti both received 0 votes. 831 delegates were accredited, nine votes was invalid. Before the election, the immediate past Commissioner for Works, Legor Idagbo, the immediate past Secretary to the State Government, Mike Aniah, Speaker of the Cross River State House of Assembly, Larry Odey and former Executive Secretary, National Planning Commission, Ntufam Fidelis Ugbo all stepped down for Benedict Ayade. Goddy Jedy Agba who got 5 votes, said he had earlier withdrawn from the primary because he felt that the delegates congress list was fraught with irregularities. After the primaries, Joe Agi who came second sued Benedict Ayade to the Federal High Court, Abuja. Joe Agi urged the Federal High Court, Abuja, to disqualify Benedict Ayade for allegedly falsifying his age in some declarations at the Independent National Electoral Commission. Joe Agi told the court that Benedict Ayade claimed to have been born on March 2, 1969, in INEC Form CF 001 whereas in the screening form, he wrote March 2, 1968, as his date of birth. Joe Agi also contested that Benedict Ayade was not a bonafide member of the PDP. The Federal High Court, Abuja dismissed Joe Agi's suit and said that it lacked merit and that the court lacks powers to intervene. The judge also said that the conduct of party primaries and election of candidates were purely domestic affairs of political parties and not the court own to judge. Joe Agi appealed the case at the Appeal court with suit NO. FHC/ABJ/CS/25/2015. The Appeal court upheld the judgement of the Federal High Court, Abuja and Joe Agi took the case to the Supreme court. The Supreme court dismissed the case and held that Benedict Ayade was validly nominated by the PDP as their candidate in the election. The Supreme court said that the false declaration of age against Benedict Ayade was not proven beyond reasonable doubt as required by law. About Benedict Ayade being a bona fide member of the PDP, the court held that it was solely a party issue and they would not interfere. The Court thereby dismissed the case as lacking merit.

Candidates
Benedict Ayade
Joe Agi
Goddy Jedy Agba
Francis Eworo
Emmanuel Ibeshi
Peter Oti

APC primary
APC candidate Odey Ochicha defeated 2 other contestants to clinch the party ticket. He won with 1,177 votes to defeat his closest rival Lazarus Undie, who received 168 votes. Mike Ogar received 40 votes. Vote cast was 1,394, valid votes was 1,385, invalid votes was 9 and those that abstained from voting was 119. The primary, according to the APC chairman in the state, Usani Usani was free and fair, devoid of violence and rigging and all the contestants accepted the result.

Candidates
Odey Ochicha
Lazarus Undie
Mike Ogar

Other governorship aspirant and party
Henrietta Henry, NNPP
Ntufam Fidelis Ugbo, LP
Okwa Philip Ogbo, ID

Results 
A total of 5 candidates contested in the election. Benedict Ayade from the PDP won the election, defeating Odey Ochicha from the APC.

Aftermath
After the election, Ntufam Fidelis Ugbo from the LP challenged the outcome of the election at the Cross River State Governorship Elections Petitions Tribunal. The LP candidate told the tribunal to nullify the governorship election, stating that it was marred by irregularities. On the day of the judgement, Ntufam Fidelis Ugbo told the tribunal that he is withdrawing the case against the PDP and the winner of the election, Benedict Ayade and so it should be struck out. The court in its ruling said the case lacked merit and substance and dismissed the petition.

References 

Cross River State gubernatorial elections
Cross River gubernatorial